In enzymology, a (R)-aminopropanol dehydrogenase is an enzyme that catalyzes the chemical reaction

(R)-1-aminopropan-2-ol + NAD  aminoacetone + NADH + H

Thus, the two substrates of this enzyme are (R)-1-aminopropan-2-ol and NAD, whereas its 3 products are aminoacetone, NADH, and H.

This enzyme belongs to the family of oxidoreductases, specifically those acting on the CH-OH group of donor with NAD or NADP as acceptor. The systematic name of this enzyme class is (R)-1-aminopropan-2-ol:NAD oxidoreductase. Other names in common use include L-aminopropanol dehydrogenase, 1-aminopropan-2-ol-NAD dehydrogenase, L()-1-aminopropan-2-ol:NAD oxidoreductase, 1-aminopropan-2-ol-dehydrogenase, DL-1-aminopropan-2-ol: NAD dehydrogenase, and L()-1-aminopropan-2-ol-NAD/NADP oxidoreductase. This enzyme participates in glycine, serine and threonine metabolism. It requires potassium as a cofactor.

References

 
 
 

EC 1.1.1
NADH-dependent enzymes
Potassium enzymes
Enzymes of unknown structure